Joseph Mendes (born 30 March 1991) is a professional footballer who plays as a forward for  club Rodez. Born in France, Mendes represents the Guinea-Bissau national football team internationally.

Club career
Born in Évreux, Mendes began his career at Grenoble in Ligue 2. He made 14 total appearances in his only season, and scored his only goal on 17 December 2010, when he came on as an 84th-minute substitute for Yoric Ravet and wrapped up a 3–1 home win over Dijon. In October 2011, he signed for Championnat National team Épinal.

In 2012, Mendes returned to the second tier with Le Mans. He remained there until December 2013, when he signed an 18-month deal with Lokomotiv Plovdiv in the Bulgarian A Football Group. In June 2014, he returned to Ligue 2 with newly promoted club Luzenac AP, who eventually were suspended from competition due to an inadequate stadium and released all of their professionals. In August, he signed a three-year deal with Le Havre in the same competition. He scored a career-best 9 goals in 2015–16, including two in a 3–1 win at Auxerre on 6 May 2016.

On 8 July 2016, Mendes signed a two-year contract with Championship side Reading. Mendes scored a brace, on his first start in a 3–1 away victory over Aston Villa on 15 April 2017. He played only seven times in his second season, and in May 2018 Reading decided against renewing his contract.

On 2 July 2018, Mendes signed for Ligue 2 club AC Ajaccio. He joined up again with Ghislain Gimbert, his former Le Havre strike partner. Goalless across his entire first season, he scored his first goal for the Corsicans on 13 August 2019 in a 4–1 home win over Valenciennes in the first round of the Coupe de la Ligue.

In 2020, Mendes signed for Ligue 2 side Niort.

On 1 July 2022, Mendes joined Rodez on a two-year deal.

International career
Born in France to a Bissau-Guinean father and a Senegalese mother, Mendes was first selected to the Guinea-Bissau national football team for the 2019 Africa Cup of Nations qualification match against Namibia in November 2018. He made his debut on 8 June 2019 in a friendly against Angola, as a starter, and later that month was chosen for the 2019 Africa Cup of Nations, in which his team were eliminated from the group stage in Egypt.

In September 2019, Mendes scored all of Guinea-Bissau's goals in a 3–1 aggregate win over São Tomé and Príncipe in the first round of qualification for the 2022 FIFA World Cup.

Career statistics

International
Scores and results list Guinea-Bissau's goal tally first, score column indicates score after each Mendes goal.

References

1991 births
Living people
Sportspeople from Évreux
Citizens of Guinea-Bissau through descent
Association football forwards
Bissau-Guinean footballers
Guinea-Bissau international footballers
French footballers
Bissau-Guinean people of Senegalese descent
French people of Bissau-Guinean descent
French sportspeople of Senegalese descent
Ligue 2 players
Championnat National players
Championnat National 2 players
Championnat National 3 players
First Professional Football League (Bulgaria) players
Grenoble Foot 38 players
SAS Épinal players
Le Mans FC players
PFC Lokomotiv Plovdiv players
Reading F.C. players
AC Ajaccio players
Chamois Niortais F.C. players
Rodez AF players
Expatriate footballers in Bulgaria
Expatriate footballers in England
French expatriate sportspeople in Bulgaria
French expatriate sportspeople in England
Bissau-Guinean expatriate sportspeople in Bulgaria
Bissau-Guinean expatriate sportspeople in England
English Football League players
Black French sportspeople
2019 Africa Cup of Nations players
2021 Africa Cup of Nations players
Footballers from Normandy